Rolf Steiger was an Austrian football defender and then coach in Italian football. Steiger's career revolved around clubs which would eventually become S.S.C. Napoli.

Club career
Steiger joined US Internazionale Napoli in 1915, a club who were played in the early Italian Football Championships. After World War I, Steiger returned to the club and carried on where he left off, eventually playing 33 league games for them and scoring 4 goals. This was the most appearances an Internazionale Napoli player participated in during the Italian Championship.

In 1922, the club merged with Naples FBC to form Internaples (which would eventually become SSC Napoli). Rolf Steiger stayed on as part of this new club in his usual defensive role.

Managerial career
As part of a Technical Commission with Giovanni Terrile and Anton Molnár, Steiger returned to S.S.C. Napoli as a manager in the 1927-28 season. This was during the era in which Attila Sallustro played for the club, the Commission was only in charge for one season however.

References

Year of birth missing
Year of death missing
Austrian footballers
Austrian expatriate footballers
S.S.C. Napoli players
Expatriate footballers in Italy
S.S.C. Napoli managers
Expatriate football managers in Italy
Austrian expatriate sportspeople in Italy
Association football defenders
Austrian football managers